Aberdare is a town in Wales.

Aberdare may also refer to:

People
Baron Aberdare:
Henry Bruce, 1st Baron Aberdare (1815-1895), British politician
Henry Bruce, 2nd Baron Aberdare (1851-1929), British soldier
Clarence Bruce, 3rd Baron Aberdare (1885-1957), British soldier, cricketer and tennis player
Morys Bruce, 4th Baron Aberdare (1919-2005), British politician
Alastair Bruce, 5th Baron Aberdare (born 1947)

Places
Aberdare (UK Parliament constituency)
Aberdare, New South Wales
Aberdare Athletic F.C.
Aberdare Boys' Comprehensive School
Aberdare Boys' Grammar School
Aberdare railway station
Aberdare Park
Aberdare Hall, Cardiff University, Wales
Aberdare National Park, Kenya
Aberdare Range, Kenya

Other uses
 , a Royal Navy minesweeper
 GWR 2600 or Aberdare Class steam locomotives